Taça Regional de São Tomé, literally the São Tomé Regional Cup  is the regional knockout tournament of the island of São Tomé, it was unilaterally created in 1981 and was entirely created in 2001.  The winner competes with the Príncipe Cup winner in the São Tomé and Príncipe Cup.

History
From 1981 to 1984, the regional cup was also the national cup as Príncipe did not have its own cup competition at the time.

In 2017, the season had a club short due to Juba de Diogo Simão's withdrawal due to its dropping successes that the club suffered and mainly low budget for that club.

Previous winners

Performance By Club

Performance by district

References

External links
RSSSF competition history

Football competitions in São Tomé and Príncipe
São Tomé Island
1981 establishments in São Tomé and Príncipe